Rolando Maria Rivi (7 January 1931 – 13 April 1945) was an Italian Roman Catholic seminarian. Rivi was noted for his studious and pious nature with an intense love for Jesus Christ which was evident through frequent confession and the reception of the Eucharist; he was amiable to all and wore his cassock with great pride to the point where he affirmed that he belonged to Christ and his church. Accusing him of having spied for the Italian Social Republic, Communist partisans murdered him "in odium fidei" (in hatred of the faith) towards the end of World War II in Modena because he was learning to become a priest added with their extreme hatred of the faith.

Rivi's holiness was well-noted in his lifetime and people began to hail him as a saint after his vicious murder in which people called for him to be beatified. The cause for his sainthood did not open until 30 September 2005 when he was titled a Servant of God while Pope Francis oversaw his beatification later on 5 October 2013.

Life

Childhood and education
Rolando Maria Rivi was born on 7 January 1931 in the rural San Valentino as the second of three sons to Roberto Rivi (30 October 1903 – 22 October 1992) and Albertina Canovi; he received his baptism on 8 January from the parish priest Luigi Lemmi. His birthplace was located in the foothills of the Apennines between the Secchia and Tresinaro rivers. His paternal grandparents were Alfonso Rivi and Anna Ferrari who had moved to Levizzano-Baiso to work the land there and since the 1920s lived in a large house named "Poggiolo" with their nine children of whom Roberto was the eldest son. Sergio Rivi was a brother of his. His father spent some months in Zadar and Istria from 1923 until 1927 when he returned home and got married.

Rivi grew up educated in the faith due to the influence of his mother and in the strong religious atmosphere was a fixture in his parish. Before going to work in the fields each morning he attended the celebration of the Mass and received the Eucharist after he made his First Communion. In this atmosphere of strong religious faith he grew along with his older brother Guido and little sister Rosanna. His exuberance and liveliness often proved a test to his parents but his grandmother Anna sensed his good character and said once that "Rolando will become either a rascal or a saint! He can not walk the middle ground".

In 1937 he began attending the local school where his teachers – Clotilde Selmi and the catechist Antoinette Maffei – cultivated his love for life and for Jesus Christ while noting his desire to know and love Jesus. He was admitted to receive his First Communion almost at once because he was among the better prepared children and eager to do so. His First Communion was made on 16 June 1938 on the Feast of Corpus Christi. Rivi changed after that event: while remaining amiable and energetic he became more mature and responsible which was a profound change which was accentuated after receiving his Confirmation on 24 June 1940 from the Bishop of Reggio Emilia Eduardo Brettoni.

Seminarian
In the meantime his parish priest Marzocchini Olinto (who in March 1934 took the place of the deceased Lemmi) became his teacher and a spiritual father. Rivi availed himself to the Sacrament of Penance each week and each morning he got up to serve Mass and receive the Eucharist. He was almost 11 when he was no longer able to ignore the beginnings of his vocation to the priesthood and he said to his parents and grandparents: "I want to be a priest to save many souls. I will go as a missionary to make Jesus known, far far away". His pious parents did not oppose the decision and after he completed his schooling he commenced his ecclesial studies in Marola in Carpineti on 1 October 1942. As was the custom he wore the cassock from the moment he entered as a seminarian and was proud of the garment viewing it as a sign of his belonging to Christ and to the church. His spiritual mentor at this time was Alfredo Castagnetti.

Rivi was forced to leave his studies and return home in June 1944 after the Nazi forces occupied the Italian nation but he still wore his cassock with pride against the wishes of his parents. His parents were worried about rising anti-religious sentiment and even violence against ecclesial figures but he refused and continued to wear it. He said to them: "I study to be a priest and these vestments are the sign that I belong to Jesus". Rivi wore his cassock during vacation periods and even during the hot summer months. He liked music and could use a harmonium. People in his village admired him for his holiness and even his father admired him and said once: "My son is so good and studious". Two of his uncles died during World War II on the frontlines. Rivi once read Divini Redemptoris that Pope Pius XI had issued in 1937.

Abduction and murder
On 10 April 1945, at the tail end of the war, he served Mass and then returned home to collect some books before going to the woods where he liked to go. A group of Communist partisans abducted Rivi while at noon his worried parents noticed he had not returned for lunch so went to the woods to find his books scattered with a note for his parents which said: "Do not search for him. He is coming with us for a little while". The partisans accused him of collaborating with the Fascists to undo them and proceeded to beat and insult him while stripping him of the cassock which caused him great pain. He was led from the woods upon his abduction 25 kilometers to a farm that fronted as their hideout and he was imprisoned in the pigpen. The men struck him on the legs with his own belt and he cried as he was beaten and suffered blasphemies against the priesthood and the church. Some of the partisans proposed letting him go since he was just a mere child but the verdict was that he was to die and said to those who were wavering: "Shut up or you will have this same fate".

On 12 April, the commander of those partisans – the Garibaldi Brigade – said: "Tomorrow one priest less" even though Rivi was not a priest. The group murdered Rivi on 13 April for their hatred of the faith was such that they were wanted to kill him in order to have rid the world of a potential priest. The men took Rivi to a shallow grave that had been dug and had him kneel on the edge but he told them: "Allow me the time to say a prayer for my father and mother". The weeping Rivi reflected before he was shot dead. Two of the partisans fired two shots with their pistols which killed him just after 3:00pm with one bullet in the heart and the other in the left temple. The men buried him and had his cassock rolled into a ball that was kicked about and then abandoned under a doorstep of a random house. In the evening on 14 April his father and the San Valentino curate Alberto Camellini found Rivi's corpse in the grave covered in bruises with the two fatal wounds. On 15 April the pair took his remains to clean him and prepare the funeral. His remains were buried at San Valentino on 29 May 1945 but were reburied within the church on 26 June 1997.

In 1951, a court in Lucca condemned Giuseppe Corghi (16 years) and Delciso Rioli (26 years) for Rivi's murder which was a sentence that the appeals court and supreme court in Florence confirmed in 1952. But both men served their time until 1957 when the then-Minister of Justice and Communist Palmiro Togliatti granted them amnesty.

Legacy
Rivi became noted in his town and the surrounding areas for his holiness and for his deep and unwavering faith to Jesus Christ. He was best remembered for his love of the cassock which he believed made him one who belonged to Christ and his church. His figure became more well known in 2001 after news broke that the English child James Blacknall (b. 1998) was cured of leukemia on 4 April 2001 after a hair and blood relic of Rivi was placed under his pillow with a novena said.

Even the L'Osservatore Romano issued two articles on Rivi twice on 12 April 2000 and on 16 January 2004.

Beatification
The beatification process opened under Pope Benedict XVI on 30 September 2005 after the Congregation for the Causes of Saints issued the official "nihil obstat" (nothing against) to the cause and titled Rivi as a Servant of God. The diocesan phase for the cause opened in Modena on 7 January 2006 and concluded a short while later on 24 June 2006 before all documentation was sent to the competent authorities in Rome in boxes where the C.C.S. reviewed them and validated the process on 30 November 2007. The postulation compiled and sent the Positio dossier to the C.C.S. in 2010 which received theological approval on 18 May 2012 and that of the C.C.S. on 8 January 2013.

Pope Francis confirmed on 27 March 2013 that Rivi was killed "in odium fidei" (in hatred of the faith) and thus approved for the beatification to take place. Rivi was beatified in Modena on 5 October 2013 with Cardinal Angelo Amato presiding over the celebration on the pope's behalf. Almost 20 000 people attended the beatification.

The current postulator for the cause is Francesca Consolini.

References

External links
 Rolando Rivi official website
 Hagiography Circle
 Pieve San Valentino
 Father Jerabek's Blog

1931 births
1945 deaths
Italian beatified people
20th-century venerated Christians
20th-century Italian people
Beatifications by Pope Francis
Burials in Emilia-Romagna
Catholic saints and blesseds of the Nazi era
Deaths by firearm in Italy
Italian murder victims
Murdered Italian children
People murdered in Emilia-Romagna
People from Reggio Emilia
Religious persecution by communists
Venerated Catholics
Italian civilians killed in World War II